The Omphalos hypothesis is one attempt to reconcile the scientific evidence that the Earth is billions of years old with a literal interpretation of the Genesis creation narrative, which implies that the Earth is only a few thousand years old. It is based on the religious belief that the universe was created by a divine being, within the past six to ten thousand years (in keeping with flood geology), and that the presence of objective, verifiable evidence that the universe is older than approximately ten millennia is due to the creator introducing false evidence that makes the universe appear significantly older.

The idea was named after the title of an 1857 book, Omphalos by Philip Henry Gosse, in which Gosse argued that for the world to be "functional", God must have created the Earth with mountains and canyons, trees with growth rings, Adam and Eve with fully grown hair, fingernails, and navels (ὀμφαλός omphalos is Greek for "navel"), and all living creatures with fully formed evolutionary features, etc., and that, therefore, no empirical evidence about the age of the Earth or universe can be taken as reliable.

Various supporters of Young Earth creationism have given different explanations for their belief that the universe is filled with false evidence of the universe's age, including a belief that some things needed to be created at a certain age for the ecosystems to function, or their belief that the creator was deliberately planting deceptive evidence.

The idea was widely rejected in the 19th century, when Gosse published his aforementioned book. It saw some revival in the 20th century by some Young Earth creationists, who extended the argument to include visible light that appears to originate from far-off stars and galaxies (addressing the "starlight problem").

Development of the idea

Pre-scientific sources 
Stories of the beginning of human life based on the creation story in Genesis have been published for centuries. The 4th-century theologian Ephrem the Syrian described a world in which divine creation instantly produced fully grown organisms:

19th-century thinkers 
By the 19th century, scientific evidence of the Earth's age had been collected, and it disagreed with a literal reading of the biblical accounts. This evidence was rejected by some writers at the time, such as François-René de Chateaubriand. Chateaubriand wrote in his 1802 book, Génie du christianisme (Part I Book IV Chapter V) that "God might have created, and doubtless did create, the world with all the marks of antiquity and completeness which it now exhibits." In modern times, Rabbi Dovid Gottlieb supported a similar position, saying that the objective scientific evidence for an old universe is strong, but wrong, and that the traditional Jewish calendar is correct.

In the middle of the 19th century, the disagreement between scientific evidence about the age of the Earth and the Western religious traditions was a significant debate among intellectuals. Gosse published Omphalos in 1857 to explain his answer to this question. He concluded that the religious tradition was correct. Gosse began with the earlier idea that the Earth contained mature organisms at the instant they were created, and that these organisms had false signs of their development, such as hair on mammals, which grows over time. He extended this idea of creating a single mature organism to creating mature systems, and concluded that fossils were an artifact of the creation process and merely part of what was necessary to make creation work. Therefore, he reasoned, fossils and other signs of the Earth's age could not be used to prove its age. 

Other contemporary proposals for reconciling the stories of creation in Genesis with the scientific evidence included the interval theory or gap theory of creation, in which a large interval of time passed in between the initial creation of the universe and the beginning of the Six Days of Creation. This idea was put forward by Archbishop John Bird Sumner of Canterbury in Treatise on the Records of Creation. Another popular idea, promoted by the English theologian John Pye Smith, was that the Garden of Eden described the events of only one small location. A third proposal, by French naturalist Georges-Louis Leclerc, Comte de Buffon, held that the six "days" of the creation story were arbitrary and large ages rather than 24-hour periods.

Theologians rejected Gosse's proposal on the grounds that it seemed to make the divine creator tell lies – either lying in the scriptures, or lying in nature. Scientists rejected it on the grounds that it disagreed with uniformitarianism, an explanation of geology that was widely supported at the time, and the impossibility of testing or falsifying the idea.

Modern creationists 
Some modern creationists still argue against scientific evidence in the same way. For instance, John D. Morris, president of the Institute for Creation Research wrote in 1990 about the "appearance of age", saying that: "...what [God] created was functionally complete right from the start—able to fulfill the purpose for which it was created".

He does not extend this idea to the geological record, preferring to believe that it was all created in the Flood, but others such as Gerald E. Aardsma go further, with his idea of "virtual history". This appears to suggest that events after the creation have changed the "virtual history" we now see, including the fossils:

Criticisms

Beginning of false creation
Although Gosse's original Omphalos hypothesis specifies a popular creation story, others have proposed that the idea does not preclude creation as recently as five minutes ago, including memories of times before this created in situ. This idea is sometimes called Last Thursdayism by its opponents, as in "the world might as well have been created last Thursday."

Scientifically, the concept is both unverifiable and unfalsifiable through any conceivable scientific study—in other words, it is impossible to conclude the truth of the hypothesis, since it requires the empirical data itself to have been arbitrarily created to look the way it does at every observable level of detail.

Deceptive creator
From a religious viewpoint, it can be interpreted as God having created a "fake" universe, such as illusions of light emitted from supernovae that never really happened, or volcanic mountains that were never really volcanoes in the first place and that never actually experienced erosion.

In a rebuttal of the claim that God might have implanted a false history of the age of the universe to test our faith in the truth of the Torah, Rabbi Natan Slifkin, an author whose works have been banned by several Haredi rabbis for going against the tenets of the Talmud, writes:

Redshift challenge
Redshift in light refers to a larger wavelength as measured by a receiver, compared to the wavelength of the same light as measured by the emitter. Scientists interpret the redshift in light received from other galaxies as evidence that the space between us and the galaxies is expanding, that some galaxies are billions of light years distant from the Milky Way, and that therefore the light has been traveling for billions of years, requiring a universe billions of years in age.

According to the Omphalos hypothesis, God created the redshift in light received from other galaxies to fool humans (beginning in the 20th century, but not before that time) into thinking that the universe is billions of years old. Among the many problems with this hypothesis (including lack of any evidence and lack of reference to the phenomenon in the Bible) is that it would require that God adjusted the shift in exquisitely precise ways for each of the billions of individual galaxies, and did so to deceive humans about the age of the universe in a way that was not detectable by humans until the 20th century.

Similar formulations

Five-minute hypothesis
The five-minute hypothesis is a skeptical hypothesis put forth by the philosopher Bertrand Russell, that proposes that the universe sprang into existence five minutes ago from nothing, with human memory and all other signs of history included. It is a commonly used example of how one may maintain extreme philosophical skepticism with regard to memory and trust in evidentially derived historical chronology.

Borges's Tlön, Uqbar, Orbis Tertius
Jorge Luis Borges, in his 1940 work, Tlön, Uqbar, Orbis Tertius, describes a fictional world in which some essentially follow as a religious belief a philosophy much like Russell's discussion on the logical extreme of Gosse's theory:

Borges had earlier written a short essay, "The Creation and P. H. Gosse" that explored the rejection of Gosse's Omphalos. Borges argued that its unpopularity stemmed from Gosse's explicit (if inadvertent) outlining of what Borges characterized as absurdities in the Genesis story.

See also
 Age of the universe
 Omphalos, a story by Ted Chiang
 "A Clockwork Origin", an episode of Futurama
 Boltzmann brain
 Conflict thesis
 Christian mythology
 Dark City (1998 film) is a movie that explores this theme
 Kabbalah (on the conceived need for constant sustainment of the universe; see Tzimtzum#Inherent paradox)
 Russell's teapot
 Strata (novel)

References

External links
 Mirror of the defunct "The Church Of Last Thursdayism" webpage (stored at www.archive.org)
 Archived Usenet Post containing the FAQ of "The Church of Last Thursdayism" (stored by Google.com)
 "The Church of Last Thursday" home

Concepts in epistemology
Creationism
Skepticism